Stein IAS  is a global advertising and marketing agency with strategic locations across Americas, EMEA and APAC.

History

Stein Rogan + Partners had its earliest roots in two predecessor companies, Words at Work, which had as its principals Bill Killpatrick and Tom Stein and Rogan Studios, which had as its principal Mark Rogan.  Words at Work was a full-service integrated marketing services agency.  As its name suggests, it was started by two copywriters and worked with clients in the publishing and technology industries.  Rogan Studios had a strong creative focus on media and travel/hospitality.

In 1984 the two companies merged to form Stein Killpatrick + Rogan with such clients as McGraw Hill, The Sporting News, etc. With the departure of Bill Killpatrick, the agency's name was changed to Stein Rogan + Partners in 1987.

In 1999, the agency was acquired by True North Communications, which in 2001, was itself acquired by the Interpublic Group of Agencies.

Cofounder and partner, Mark Rogan, left Stein Rogan in May 2001. He opened his own agency in 2006, Teaglebee Digital. Teaglebee focuses on attraction-based, inbound marketing for its telecommunication, health care and B2B clients.

In 2006, the agency worked with famed director, Joseph Kahn to produce the spot for Cosmeo – the first online video homework help tool powered by the Discovery Channel.

In 2008, CEO Tom Stein was inducted into the Creative Excellence in Business Advertising (CEBA) Hall of Fame in New York. The CEBA Hall of Fame was established in 1995 to honor the brilliance of business-to-business advertising.

In 2011, US marketing agency Stein Rogan + Partners rebranded as Stein + Partners Brand Activation. In 2013, Stein + Partners Brand Activation merged with IAS B2B Marketing to form Stein IAS. Launched in 1973, IAS b2b Marketing was widely considered to have defined the communications category ‘B2B marketing’, marking the UK’s first specialist B2B marketing agency.

Thought leadership 

2021

Stein IAS launched ‘In Search for the Emotionally-Qualified Lead (EQL)’, a report which reveals why emotionally-lead marketing is just as important in B2B buying decisions. Stein IAS’ report looks at different levels of emotional value and how, when combined with rational, functional and economic value, B2B marketing ideas can become much more valuable in the eyes of the customer. 

2016

In a coproduction with The Drum, Stein IAS launched a twelve-part Cliché Killers video series, telling the story of the 12 most abused clichés in the history of marketing. 

Stein IAS published a new book charting the pre-modern, modern and era of ‘Post Modern Marketing’. Titled ‘Paradox: Feeling Machines and the Rise of Post-Modern Marketing’, the book depicts marketing’s transformation from the pre-digital marketing world of Mad Men to the digital- and technology-powered age of modern marketing and now the dawn of marketing’s new post-modern era. 

2014

Stein IAS, together with Oracle Marketing Cloud, launched the ‘Digital Marketing Maturity Index’ (DMMI), a worldwide study designed to assess the digital marketing maturity of the business marketing community and enable B2B enterprise marketers to evaluate the sophistication of their digital demand generation activity against an international benchmark. 

2007

Stein IAS launched a book, ‘101 Clichés - B2Bs Most Notorious Creative Faux Pas’, beginning a long-standing fight against clichéd creative in modern B2B marketing.

Awards 
2021: Receives a WARC Awards for Effectiveness – Business to Business 
2021: Named Agency of the Year at B2B Marketing’s Elevation Awards USA 
2020: Named B2B Communications Agency of the Year at the 2021 B2B Marketing Awards
2020: Receives Network Marketing Services Company of the Year at the 2020 Drum Agency Business Awards  
2020: Named ‘Agency of the Year’ (Under $25 Million and over) – Silver at the 2020 ANA B2 Awards  
2019: Named ‘Agency of the Year’ (Under $25 Million and over) – at the 2019 ANA B2 Awards 
2019: Receives Princess Royal Training Award 
2018: Named ‘Agency of the Year’ (Under $25 Million and over) – at the 2018 ANA B2 Awards 
2017: Named ‘Agency of the Year’ (Under $25 Million and over) – at the 2017 ANA B2 Awards 
2016: Named ‘Agency of the Year’ (Under $25 Million and over) – at the 2016 ANA B2 Awards
2015: Named ‘Agency of the Year’ (Under $25 Million and over) – at the 2015 ANA B2 Awards
2013: Named ‘Agency of the Year’ (Under $25 Million and over) – at the 2013 ANA B2 Awards
2012: Named ‘Agency of the Year’ (Under $25 Million and over) – at the 2012 ANA B2 Awards
2011: Named ‘Agency of the Year’ (Under $25 Million and over) – at the 2011 ANA B2 Awards
2011: Named BtoB Magazine's #1 Agency of the Year
2010: Named Agency of the Year by the Business Marketing Association and designation as a Top Agency of the Year by BtoB Magazine
2008: Named one of Top 3 BtoB Magazine's Small Agency of the Year
2007: Named one of Top 3 BtoB Magazine's Small Agency of the Year
2006: SR+P featured in BtoB Magazine's "Integrated Marketing Success Stories" 
2005: SR+P honored as Top Small Agency of the Year by BtoB Magazine

References

External links
 Official website

Advertising agencies of the United States
Companies based in New York City